F. Dale Johnston (born November 14, 1941 in Ponoka, Alberta) is a former Canadian politician. He began his career in politics in 1986 as a councillor in Ponoka, and he then became reeve in 1989. In 1993 Canadian federal election, he was elected into the House of Commons of Canada. He was elected as a member of the Reform Party of Canada in the riding of Wetaskiwin. He was re-elected in the 1997 Canadian federal election, and in the 2000 Canadian federal election (as a member of the Canadian Alliance) and again in the 2004 Canadian federal election (as a member of the Conservative Party of Canada). A farmer, he served as Chief Opposition Whip and Whip of the Conservative Party from 2002 to 2004 and twice more in 2004. He has also been the Opposition critic to the Minister of Labour and to Parliamentary Affairs.  Johnston retired from parliament at its dissolution prior to the 2006 federal election.

Johnston's father, Glen Johnston, served as the member for Ponoka in the Legislative Assembly of Alberta from 1952 to 1967.

References

1941 births
Canadian Alliance MPs
Conservative Party of Canada MPs
Living people
Members of the House of Commons of Canada from Alberta
People from Ponoka, Alberta
Reform Party of Canada MPs
21st-century Canadian politicians